Kirk B. R. Woller is an American actor who has played Gaius in The Chosen, Agent Gene Crane on The X-Files, and the boss of the mysterious cleaners in Charmed. His notable film characters include coach Cal Sawyer in Hometown Legend, Chief Officer Reynolds in Poseidon, detective Frank Shaw in Urban Justice, hotel-clerk Jordan in Hollywoo, and the cab driver in The Ride where he was nominated for Best Male Performance.

His other guest star appearances include Melrose Place, Nash Bridges, NYPD Blue, ER, CSI, JAG, CSI: Miami, Alias, NCIS, Criminal Minds, 24, The Unit, Bones, Without a Trace, Boston Legal, Ghost Whisperer, Prison Break, Big Love, Criminal Minds: Suspect Behavior, Extant, and Switched at Birth.

Other film roles include Swordfish, Minority Report, The Hulk, After the Sunset, The Ring Two, Flightplan, Big Momma's House 2, Flags of Our Fathers, Resident Evil: Extinction, and Woodlawn.

Filmography

Film

Television

References

External links

Living people
American male film actors
American male television actors
20th-century American male actors
21st-century American male actors
1962 births